Miguel Mba (born 20 November 1979) is an Equatoguinean football goalkeeper.

He played with his national team against Gabon in two matches corresponding to the Africa Cup of Nations 2000 Qualifying. He also played against Congo in two matches corresponding to the World Cup 2002 Qualifying.

References

External links

1979 births
Living people
Equatoguinean footballers
Equatorial Guinea international footballers
Association football goalkeepers